The Doghole River is a river in the Unorganized Part of Kenora District in Northwestern Ontario, Canada. The river is part of the James Bay drainage basin. It flows from Doghole Lake, where the outlet is part of the Mishkeegogamang First Nation Osnaburgh Indian Reserve No. 63B, to the northeast shore of Lake St. Joseph; oddly, the mouth is not on Doghole Bay, adjacent to the east. Lake St. Joseph is the source of the Albany River, which flows to James Bay.

References

Sources

Rivers of Kenora District